(born March 9, 1990) is a Japanese retired figure skater. He is the 2014 World silver medalist, the 2010 Four Continents silver medalist, and the 2013–14 Japanese national silver medalist. Machida is the winner of four Grand Prix events — the 2012 Cup of China, 2013 Skate America, 2013 Rostelecom Cup, and 2014 Skate America.

Personal life 
Tatsuki Machida was born in Kawasaki, Kanagawa, Japan. He studied literature at Kansai University in Osaka. In 2015, he began a Master's program in sport management at Waseda University's Graduate School of Sciences.

Career 
In 2011, Machida moved to the U.S. to train at Lake Arrowhead, California's Ice Castle, where he was coached mainly by Anthony Liu.

Machida won his first senior Grand Prix medal, bronze, at the 2012 Skate America. He won his first senior GP title at the 2012 Cup of China, where he beat former World champion Daisuke Takahashi. These results qualified him for the Grand Prix Final, where he finished sixth overall.

At the 2013 Skate America, Machida won his second GP title. He placed first in the short and free programs, setting personal bests in both and winning by 25 points over second-place finisher, Adam Rippon of the United States. At 2013 Rostelecom Cup, Machida was second after the short program behind Maxim Kovtun of Russia. However, he won the free skate by over 25 points to win the competition – over 16 points ahead of Kovtun. This meant that he qualified for the Grand Prix Final in second overall, behind Patrick Chan of Canada. At the Grand Prix Final he recovered from a rough short program to skate a very strong long program, and finish 4th. He would finish 2nd at the 2013–14 Japan Figure Skating Championships, securing a spot on the Japanese Olympic and World teams for the first time.

At the 2014 Winter Olympics in Sochi, Machida placed 11th in the short program, fourth in the free skate, and fifth overall. Machida significantly improved his personal best short program score at the 2014 World Championships in Saitama, Japan and ranked first in the segment. He placed second in the free skate and was awarded the silver medal, finishing behind Yuzuru Hanyu by a margin of 0.33 of a point.

For the 2014–15 season, Machida was assigned to the 2014 Skate America and 2014 Trophée Éric Bompard. Skating to his second Skate America title, he placed first in the short and free programs, setting personal bests in both, and won by 30 points over the second-place finisher, Jason Brown of the United States. It was Machida's fourth GP title. At the 2014 Trophée Éric Bompard, he placed second in both the short program and the free program to finish second overall behind Maxim Kovtun. This qualified him for the Grand Prix Final for the third consecutive year. After finishing second in the short program, he struggled in the long program, finishing sixth in that segment and overall. Machida finished fourth at the 2014–15 Japan Championships and was selected for the 2015 World team. However, he announced his retirement from competitive skating to focus on his studies, and Takahito Mura was given his World spot.

In June 2018, Machida announced that his final appearance as a show skater would be Japan Open 2018 and Carnival on Ice 2018 on October 6, 2018. After his retirement, his focus would be on his studies.

Cultural references 
It has been reported that Machida was the inspiration for the character of Yuri Katsuki in the 2016 figure-skating anime Yuri on Ice, due to the similarities between Machida's real-life career and Katsuki's fictional career. The series author, Mitsurō Kubo, is a fan of Tatsuki.

Programs

Competitive highlights
 GP: Grand Prix; JGP: Junior Grand Prix

References

External links 

 
 

Japanese male single skaters
1990 births
Living people
People from Kawasaki, Kanagawa
Sportspeople from Hiroshima
Four Continents Figure Skating Championships medalists
Figure skaters at the 2014 Winter Olympics
Olympic figure skaters of Japan
Figure skaters at the 2011 Asian Winter Games
Kansai University alumni
World Figure Skating Championships medalists
Competitors at the 2009 Winter Universiade